

Torhthere (died ) was a medieval Bishop of Hereford.

Torhthere was consecrated in 710 and died between 727 and 731.

Notes

Citations

References

External links
 

Bishops of Hereford
8th-century English bishops
8th-century deaths
Year of birth unknown